Superdupont is a French comic strip created in 1972 by Marcel Gotlib and Jacques Lob. It is a spoof of American super-hero comics that sends up French national attitudes.

Publication history
Superdupont was initially published in the Franco-Belgian comics magazine Pilote from September 21, 1972 and moved to Gotlib's own magazine Fluide Glacial in 1975.

The series, published irregularly through the decades, was originally written by Lob and Gotlib (who teamed up after finding out they had both had the same idea independently) and drawn by Gotlib. Gotlib passed on the art duties to Alexis, who was succeeded after his 1977 death by Jean Solé.  Episodes have been drawn by Daniel Goossens, Al Coutelis, François Bouck, Gotlib again and Neal Adams. After Lob died in 1990, the series was written again by Gotlib with co-writers Lefred-Thouron, Bouck,  then Belkrouf.  No Superdupont comics have been made since Gotlib's death in 2016.

The character
Superdupont is the son of the Unknown Soldier buried under the Arc de Triomphe. He is caricaturally chauvinistic and gifted with superpowers that help him to defend his country against a secret terrorist organisation called "Anti-France".

Anti-France agents are all foreigners and thus speak the fictional language "Anti-Français", a mishmash of English, Spanish, Italian, Russian, and German.

The physical appearance of Superdupont is a superhero version of a caricatural Frenchman (specially, as seen by the Anglophone world): he wears a beret, a striped jersey, slippers, a tricolour belt held by a safety pin, a long blue cape. He also supports economic patriotism, as he smokes Gauloises cigarettes, drinks red wine, eats French cheese and refuses to be painted using China ink.

Like Superman, Superdupont is able to fly but seems less superpowered than Superman. Superdupont is a master at savate also known as boxe française ("French boxing"), which gives some superiority over his opponents.

Publications
Tome 1 : Superdupont (by Jacques Lob, Gotlib and Alexis)
Tome 2 : Amour et forfaiture (by Jacques Lob, Gotlib and Solé)
Tome 3 : Opération Camembert (by Jacques Lob, Gotlib and Solé)
Tome 4 : Oui nide Iou (by Jacques Lob, Gotlib, Alexis, Solé, Daniel Goossens, Neal Adams and Coutelis)
Tome 5 : Les âmes noires (by Jacques Lob, Gotlib, Alexis, Solé)
Tome 6 : Superdupont pourchasse l'ignoble (by Marcel Gotlib, Lefred-Thouron, Solé)

See also 
 Superlópez (Spanish counterpart)

Sources

 Superdupont publications in Pilote and Fluide Glacial BDoubliées 
 Superdupont albums Bedethque 

Footnotes

Comic strip superheroes
Satirical comics
Parody comics
Parody superheroes
1972 comics debuts
Fictional French people
French comics characters
Comics characters introduced in 1972
Parodies of Superman
French political satire
Comics set in France